Charles Challen (15 February 1894 – 20 June 1960) was a British barrister and politician.

Biography 
Challen received a Bachelor of Laws and Master's degree from Jesus College, Cambridge (later becoming a member of the Oxford and Cambridge Club). During the First World War, he served in France and Egypt as a Lieutenant in the Royal Field Artillery. He never married. Challen was Conservative Member of Parliament (MP) for Hampstead from 1941 to 1950.
In October 1945, an antisemitic petition was drawn up, with the help of Waldron Smithers's (Conservative MP for Orpington) Fighting Fund for Freedom, by residents of Hampstead, requesting "that aliens of Hampstead should be repatriated to assure men and women of the Forces should have accommodation upon their return" from World War II. The petition was signed by the antisemitic Conservative mayor of Hampstead Sydney A. Boyd and four of Hampstead's Conservative councillors, with the rest of the Conservative members of the council in favour of the petition. Hampstead's Conservative MP, Charles Challen, promised to give the petition his "unstinting support" and he asked a number of questions in the House of Commons on behalf of the petitioners over the following months. When the petition was complete, Conservative Councillor J. A. Hughes passed it to Challen who, "rather than repudiate the sponsors for their antisemitism", delivered it to Parliament.
He died on 20 June 1960, aged 66.

References

External links 
 

1894 births
1960 deaths
UK MPs 1935–1945
UK MPs 1945–1950
Conservative Party (UK) MPs for English constituencies
Place of birth missing
British barristers
People from Hampstead
British Army personnel of World War I
Royal Field Artillery officers